William Thomas Haines (August 7, 1854 – June 4, 1919) was an American politician and the 49th Governor of Maine.

Early years 
William Thomas Haines was born in Levant, Maine on August 7, 1854. As an undergraduate at the University of Maine, he founded the Eternal Companions Society  on the Orono Campus in 1875. The fraternity was later chartered as the Beta Eta chapter of Beta Theta Pi and Haines was issued roll number 1 in the new organization.  He graduated as Valedictorian of the University of Maine class of 1876 and went on to study law at Albany Law School where he completed his LL.B. degree in 1878. In May, 1879, Haines settled at Oakland (then West Waterville), Kennebec County, Maine, and commenced the practice of law. He remained there until October, 1880. He then moved to Waterville, Maine.

Politics 
Haines became the county attorney of Kennebec County in 1882. He held that position for five years. He became a member of the Maine State Senate in 1888. He held that position until 1892. He became a member of the Maine House of Representatives in 1895. He served as the attorney general of Maine (1896-1901) and then became a member of the governor’s executive council (1901-1905).

Governor of Maine 
Haines was nominated for the governorship of Maine by the Republican Party in 1912. He went on to win the general election by a popular vote. He held the governor's office from January 1, 1913 to January 6, 1915. During his administration, a bond issue was authorized for road improvements. A public utilities bill and an anti-trust act were sanctioned. He was unsuccessful in his re-election bid.

Personal life 
Haines married Edith S. Hemenway. He had three children. He was a Unitarian.

Sources 

 Sobel, Robert and John Raimo. Biographical Directory of the Governors of the United States, 1789-1978. Greenwood Press, 1988. 

1854 births
1919 deaths
Republican Party governors of Maine
University of Maine alumni
People from Levant, Maine
Politicians from Waterville, Maine
Albany Law School alumni
Members of the Executive Council of Maine
American Unitarians
19th-century American politicians
Maine Attorneys General